Oderwald is a Samtgemeinde ("collective municipality") in the district of Wolfenbüttel, in Lower Saxony, Germany. It is situated along the river Oker, approx. 10 km south of Wolfenbüttel. It is named after the Oderwald, a small chain of hills in the municipality. Its seat is in the village Börßum.

The Samtgemeinde Oderwald consists of the following municipalities:

 Börßum
 Cramme 
 Dorstadt 
 Flöthe 
 Heiningen 
 Ohrum

References

Samtgemeinden in Lower Saxony